The Sumiyoshi-ikka (住吉一家 "Sumiyoshi Family") is an affiliate of the Sumiyoshi-kai yakuza syndicate, based in Tokyo, Japan.  

Yakuza groups